Gymnobela felderi is a species of sea snail, a marine gastropod mollusk in the family Raphitomidae.

Description
The length of the shell attains 8 mm, its diameter 4.5 mm.

Distribution
G. felderi can be found in the Gulf of Mexico, off the coast of Louisiana.

References

 Bouchet, P.; Fontaine, B. (2009). List of new marine species described between 2002-2006. Census of Marine Life.

External links
  García E.F. 2005. Six new deep-water molluscan species (Gastropoda: Epitoniidae, Conoidea) from the Gulf of Mexico. Novapex, 6(4): 79-87
  Rosenberg, G.; Moretzsohn, F.; García, E. F. (2009). Gastropoda (Mollusca) of the Gulf of Mexico, Pp. 579–699 in: Felder, D.L. and D.K. Camp (eds.), Gulf of Mexico–Origins, Waters, and Biota. Texas A&M Press, College Station, Texas
 Gastropods.com: Gymnobela felderi

felderi
Gastropods described in 2005